Tõutsi Airfield (ICAO: EETI) is an airfield in Tõutsi, Valga County, Estonia.

The airfield's owner is Joosti Puhkemaja.

References

Airports in Estonia
Buildings and structures in Valga County
Otepää Parish